Plum Creek may refer to:

Waterways in the United States
Plum Creek (Douglas County, Colorado)
Plum Creek (Des Moines River tributary), Iowa
Plum Creek (Nanticoke River tributary), Maryland and Delaware
Plum Creek (Big Fork River tributary), Minnesota
Plum Creek (Cottonwood River tributary), Minnesota
Plum Creek (Mississippi River tributary), Minnesota
Plum Creek (St. Francis River tributary), Missouri
Plum Creek (Ottawa River tributary), Ohio
Plum Creek (Allegheny River tributary), Pennsylvania
Plum Creek (Little Shamokin Creek tributary), Pennsylvania
Plum Creek (Wisconsin)

Waterways in Canada
Plum Creek (Manitoba), a tributary of the Souris River

Places
Plum Creek, Iowa, a ghost town
Plum Creek Township (disambiguation)
Plum Creek, Virginia, an unincorporated community

Other uses
Battle of Plum Creek, an attack by involving Comanche and Tonkawa tribes near Lockhart, Texas, on August 12, 1840
Plum Creek Railroad Attack, a train derailment in August 1867
Plum Creek Timber, the largest private landowner in the United States

See also
 Plum Branch (disambiguation)
 Plum Run (disambiguation)